The National Ordinary People Empowerment Union (NOPEU) is a political party in Kenya. It is led by Member of Parliament from Meru County.

Rodgers Kipembe, The son of former Tigania East Member of Parliament Mpuru Aburi​  "is among the founders of NOPEU party that mainly aims at giving a platform to the ordinary members of the public seeking to transform the country through elective posts."

History 
The party contested the 2022 Kenyan general election supporting Azimio La Umoja and elected one MP.

References

Political parties in Kenya